Sheikh Dr. Mohammad Ali Shomali (born 22 December 1965) is a Muslim scholar, academic, philosopher and theologian. His religious rank is Hujjat al-Islam.

Early life and education 
Shomali was born 1965 in Tehran, Iran. He studied in the religious seminaries of Qom, and also completed a bachelors and masters degree in Western Philosophy from the University of Tehran. He then received his doctorate in Philosophy from the University of Manchester. Shomali's thesis was on ethical relativism, and his postdoctoral research was on ethical issues related to life and death.

Posts 
Shomali currently holds a number of posts including:

 Founding Director at the International Institute for Islamic Studies in Qom, Iran.
 Head of the Imam Khomeini's Educational and Research Institute religious department. 
 Editor-in-chief to the Message of Thaqalayn Journal and the Spiritual Quest Journal.

He was the resident alim, and director of the Islamic Centre of England in London, from 2014 until 2019.

Works 
Shomali is Interested in effective participation through attending or organising interreligious dialogue in UK, in addition to Several countries such as USA, Canada, and several European countries and some of Asian countries.

Co-edited

Catholics-Shi'a Dialogue volumes 
He has an active role in the realm of  interfaith dialogue between Shiite scholars and Catholic theologians, He has contributed to editing the following books in collaboration with Abbott Timothy Wright and other scholars and theologians, he won Award for Book of the Year in the Special Session Interreligious Dialogue: Islam and Christianity in The 24th World Award for Book of the Year of the Islamic Republic of Iran 2017, And also Dr Abbott Timothy Wright won the same Award in 2017.
 Catholics & Shi'a in Dialogue: (Studies in Theology & Spirituality) (2004 & 2011).
 Studies in Theology & Spirituality Catholic-Shi'a Engagement: (Reason & Faith in Theory and Practice) (2006 & 2011).
 A Catholic-Shi‘a Dialogue: (Ethics in Today’s Society) (2008 & 2011).
 
Monks and Muslims III : towards a global Abrahamic community (2015)

Protestant-Shi'a Dialogue volumes 
 Faith and Modernity: A Muslim-Christian Conversation (2018)

Publications 
 Mary, Jesus and Christianity: an Islamic Perspective, 2007 
 
 
 
 Self Development: Essays on Islamic Spirituality, 2016 
 Ethical Relativism: An Analysis of the Foundations of Morality
 
 Shi‘a Islam: Origins, Faith & Practices 2003 
 Principles of Jurisprudence: An Introduction to Methodology of Fiqh
 The Image of God in the Qur’an
 Spritual Quest: A Biannual Journal of Ethics and Spirituality, 2013
 God: Existence & Attributes, 2014
 

 
 
 The Second Fatimah: The Spiritual Role of Lady Ma'sumah and a Study of Her Ziyarah, 2019
 Islamic Belief System, 2020
 
 Faith and Modernity: A Muslim - Christian Conversation, 2018 (Co-author)
 Lessons on Imamah and Wilayah, 2019 
 Islamic Plan for Life, 2020
 
 Lessons on Islamic Beliefs, 2020
 Unity of God and Unity in God: Wings of Unity Series, Part One
 Apostle of God
 Islam: Doctrines, Practices & Morals
 El Sistema de la Creencia Islámica
Some of his books have been translated and published into several languages.

References

External links 
 shomali.net Official Page (Lectures &Publications )
 BIOGRAPHY OF Mohammad Ali Shomali
 Books by Dr Mohammad Ali Shomali
 Dr.mohammad-ali-shomali (Lectures &Books &Articles)
 Interview with Dr Mohammad Ali Shomali, PLURIEL

Iranian writers
Iranian academics
21st-century Iranian philosophers
Iranian Shia clerics
Iranian Shia scholars of Islam
1965 births
Living people
People from Tehran
Academics of the University of Manchester
University of Tehran alumni